The Bride of the Colorado is a 1928 film starring John Boles.

External links

Films set in Colorado
American romantic drama films
American black-and-white films
American silent films
Pathé Exchange films
1928 films
Films directed by Elmer Clifton
1928 romantic drama films
1920s English-language films
1920s American films
Silent romantic drama films